Kate Harper may refer to:

Kate M. Harper (born 1956), American politician
Kate Harper (The West Wing), fictional character in the American television series The West Wing